The Mitsubishi 6A1 engine is a series of piston V6 engines from Mitsubishi Motors, found in their small and medium vehicles through the 1990s.

Now out of production, the  6A10 is still the smallest modern production V6. The small displacement was offered so Japanese buyers could purchase a powerful engine, while reducing their annual road tax obligation.

6A10
Displacement — 
Bore x Stroke —

DOHC
Engine type — V type 6-cylinder DOHC 24-valve
Compression ratio — 10.0:1
Fuel system — ECI multi
Peak power —  at 7000 rpm
Peak torque —  at 4500 rpm

Applications
1992–1994 Mitsubishi Mirage
1992–1998 Mitsubishi Lancer

6A11
Displacement — 
Bore x Stroke —

SOHC
Engine type — V type 6-cylinder SOHC 24-valve
Compression ratio — 9.5:1
Fuel system — ECI multi
Peak power —  at 6000 rpm
Peak torque —  at 4500 rpm

Applications
1992–96 Mitsubishi Galant/Eterna/Emeraude
1995–98 Mitsubishi Mirage

6A12

Displacement — 
Bore x Stroke''' — 

DOHCEngine type — V type 6-cylinder DOHC 24-valveCompression ratio — 9.5:1, 10.0:1, 10.4:1Fuel system — ECI multiPeak power —  at 6000–6750Peak torque —  at 4000–4500

Applications
1992-1996 Mitsubishi Galant/Eterna/Emeraude
1992-1994 Mitsubishi Diamante
1994-2000 Mitsubishi FTO
1999-2010 Proton Perdana
2005-2009 Proton Waja Chancellor

DOHC & sports ECU
Engine type — V type 6-cylinder DOHC 24-valve
Compression ratio — 10.0:1
Fuel system — ECI multi
Peak power (1994–1996) —  at 7000 rpm
Peak torque —  at 4000 rpm

Applications
1994–2000 Mitsubishi FTO
1992–1996 Mitsubishi Galant/Eterna/Emeraude

MIVEC
Engine type — V type 6-cylinder DOHC 24-valve MIVEC
Compression ratio — 10.0:1
Fuel system — ECI multi
Peak power —  at 7500 rpm
Peak torque —  at 6500 rpm

Applications
1994–2000 Mitsubishi FTO
1993–2002 Mitsubishi Galant

DOHC Twin Turbo
Engine Type — V Type 6-Cylinder QUADCAM 24-Valve
Compression Ratio — 8.5:1
Fuel System — ECI Multi
Injector Size — 
Peak Power —  at 6000 rpm
Peak Torque —  at 4000 rpm
Turbocharger Model — Mitsubishi Heavy Industries TD025M-7G Eterna VR-4/ TD025L-7G Mitsubishi Galant Sports GT 1994

Applications
1994 Mitsubishi Galant Sports GT VR-4 TD025L-7G  
1992–96 Mitsubishi Galant VR-4 — E84A
1992–96 Mitsubishi Eterna XX-4/GT — E84A
1994-1996 Mitsubishi Galant Sports GT (E50-E60-E70-E80)

Accelerations:
0- (sec):4.3
0- (sec):6.4
0- (sec):15.6
0- (sec):29
0- (sec):
0- (sec):4.4
0- (sec):6.1
0- (sec):15.8
0- (sec):
0- (sec):

6A13
Displacement — 
Bore x Stroke — 

SOHC
Engine type — V type 6-cylinder SOHC 24-valve
Compression ratio — 9.0, 9.5:1
Fuel system — ECI multi
Peak power —  at 5750 rpm
Peak torque —  at 4500 rpm

Applications
1996–2003 Mitsubishi Galant/Legnum
2002–2005 Mitsubishi Diamante

Twin Turbo DOHC 
Engine Type — V Type 6-Cylinder DOHC 24-Valve
Compression Ratio — 8.5:1
Fuel System — MPI Mitsubishi ECI Multi
Peak Power —  at 5500 rpm
Peak Torque —  at 4000 rpm
Turbocharger Model — Mitsubishi TD03-7T
Injector Size — 
Applications
1996–2003 Mitsubishi Galant/Legnum VR-4 — EC5A/EC5W

Accelerations:
0- (sec):3.7
0- (sec):5.3
0- (sec):13.3
0- (sec):23.2

See also

Mitsubishi Motors engines

References
 "Engine Epic Part 8 - Mitsubishi Engines", Michael Knowling, Autospeed'', issue 48, 21 September 1999

6A1
V6 engines